Jordan Kerr and Jim Thomas were the defending champions, but chose not to participate that year.

Mardy Fish and John Isner won in the final 6–4, 7–6(7–1) against Rohan Bopanna and Aisam-ul-Haq Qureshi

Seeds

Draw

Draw

External links
 Draw

Doubles